Podocarpus costaricensis is a species of conifer in the family Podocarpaceae.  It is endemic to Costa Rica.

References

costaricensis
Flora of Costa Rica
Vulnerable plants
Taxonomy articles created by Polbot
Taxa named by David John de Laubenfels
Flora of the Talamancan montane forests